Mark Gruner (born December 29, 1958) is an American actor.

He played Robert Mueller in A Little Game (1971), by Paul Wendkos, and Perron in The Tribe (1974), by Richard A. Colla. His final and most notable role was Mike Brody in Jaws 2 (1978).

Filmography
 Jaws 2 (1978) as Mike Brody
 The Tribe (1974) as Perron
 Fantastic Planet (1973) as Young Terr
 A Little Game (1971) as Robert Mueller
 Dan August (1970) as Jimmy Eberson
 The Brady Bunch (1970) as Clark Tyson

References

External links
 
 
 

1958 births
People from Fort Leonard Wood, Missouri
Male actors from Missouri
Film male child actors
American male film actors
American male television actors
Television male child actors
Living people